Princesa Isabel is a municipality in the state of Paraíba in the Northeast Region of Brazil.

See also
List of municipalities in Paraíba
Isabel, Princess Imperial of Brazil (1846–1921), the princess mainly known as "Princesa Isabel" in Brazil

References

Municipalities in Paraíba